Chahar Tang or Chehar Tang may refer to:
 Chahar Tang-e Olya, Khuzestan Province
 Chahar Tang-e Sofla, Khuzestan Province
 Chahar Tang, Kohgiluyeh and Boyer-Ahmad